Desmosoma is a genus of isopods.

References 

 Brix, S. (2007). Four new species of Desmosomatidae Sars, 1897 (Crustacea: Isopoda) from the deep sea of the Angola Basin. Marine Biology Research 3: 205–230.
 Hessler, R.R. (1970). The Desmosomatidae (Isopoda, Asellota) of the Gay Head-Bermuda Transect. Bulletin of the Scripps Institution of Oceanography 15, 1-185.
 Sars, G.O. (1864). Om en anomal Gruppe af Isopoder. Forhandlinger i Videnskaps-selskabet i Christiania 1863: 205–221.
 Sars, G.O. (1897). An account of the Crustacea of Norway. Vol. II. Isopoda. Part VII, VIII. Desmosomidae, Munnopsidae (part). Bergen: 117–144, pl. 49-64.

External links 
 

Asellota
Malacostraca genera